Leningrad Secondary Art School was established in 1934 as the first art school for gifted children.

History 
The Leningrad Secondary Art School was found in 1934 by initiative of Leningrad communist party boss Sergei Kirov as the first in the Soviet Union art school for gifted children.

Located in the Academy of Arts building in Leningrad,  in 1936 it was transformed in the Secondary Art School.  In 1947 the Secondary Art School became a division of the USSR Academy of Arts which in 1973 was named after the noted artist Boris Ioganson.

Since 1992 it has been the B. Ioganson  St. Petersburg State Academy Art Lyceum   
comprising three divisions: painting, sculpture and architecture.

Among its first teachers were mostly professors and teachers of the Academy of Arts: Konstantin Lepilov,  Leonid Ovsyannikov, Leonid Sholokhov, Vladimir Gorb, Samuil Nevelshtein, Alexander Debler, Alexander Zaytsev, and many others. The School boasts its such alumni of international reputation as Mikhail Anikushin, Alexei Eriomin, Oleg Lomakin, Maya Kopitseva, Nikolai Pozdneev, Yuri Tulin, Mikhail Kaneev, Valentina Monakhova, Vladimir Chekalov, Georgy Kovenchuk, Marina Kozlovskaya, Elena Kostenko, Nina Veselova, Evgenia Antipova, Anatoli Levitin, Vecheslav Zagonek, and other.

The most gifted children with the four-year experience in the primary school are selected to become students of the Lyceum for the free of charge eight-year training. The Diploma of the secondary art education allows its graduates to enroll the higher art educational entities, including I. Repin St. Petersburg State Academy Institute of Painting, Sculpture and Architecture.

Since 1997, the Lyceum has arranged annual international children's art competitions named after I. Repin and exhibitions of its most talented  students’ works of art.

The teachers’ staff consists mostly of the graduates of the I. Repin Institute of Painting, Sculpture and Architecture thus continuing the traditions of the Russian art school.

Alumni 
 Mikhail Konstantinovich Anikushin (1917 - 1997)
 Evgenia Petrovna Antipova (1917 - 2009)
 Yuri Vladimirovich Belov (b. 1929) 
 Vladimir Fedorovich Chekalov (1922 - 1992)
 Abram Borisovich Grushko (1918 - 1980)
 Nikolai Matveevich Pozdneev (1930 - 1978)
 Mikhail Alexandrovich Kaneev (1923 - 1983)
 Georgy Vasilyevich Kovenchuk (1933-2015)
 Elena Mikhailovna Kostenko (b. 1926)
 Marina Andreevna Kozlovskaya (b. 1925)
 Tatiana Vladimirovna Kopnina (1921 - 2009)
 Maya Kuzminichna Kopitseva (1924 - 2005)
 Valentina Vasilievna Monakhova (b. 1932)
 Alexander Sergeevich Stolbov (b. 1929)
 Vladimir Stanislavovich Sakson (1927 - 1988)
 Yuri Nilovich Tulin (1921 - 1986)
 Alexander Tikhonovich Pushnin (1921 - 1991)
 Nina Veselova (1922 - 1960)
 Vecheslav Zagonek (1919 - 1994)

References

Bibliography 
 Львов Е. Таланты одной школы // Смена, 1940, 28 февраля.
 Митрохина Л., Кириллова Л. История создания Средней художественной школы // Петербургские искусствоведческие тетради. Вып. 16. СПб, 2009. С.48—69.
 Траугот В.Воспоминания о СХШ // Герои ленинградской культуры 1950—1980. СПб., ЦВЗ Манеж, 2005. С.174—176.

1934 establishments in the Soviet Union
Educational institutions established in 1934
Culture in Saint Petersburg
Buildings and structures in Saint Petersburg
Universitetskaya Embankment
Art schools in Russia
Schools in Saint Petersburg
Soviet art
Education in the Soviet Union
Secondary schools in Russia